Anna Batasova (born October 26, 2004 in Moscow, Russia) is a Russian group rhythmic gymnast. She is the 2019 World Junior Group All-Around, Team, 5 Hoops and 5 Ribbons champion and the 2019 European Junior Group All-Around, Team, 5 Hoops and 5 Ribbons champion.

Career

Junior 
Anna was born in Moscow on October 26, 2004 and began training rhythmic gymnastics at age 4 in her hometown Shchyolkovo. Coach Vera Viktorovna Milova saw potential in her and invited her to train in Dmitrov school. She was a member of Russian Group that competed at the 2019 World Junior Championships in Moscow, Russia taking the gold medal scoring a total of (49.550) ahead of Italy (45.100) and Belarus (43.100) in the all-around competition. They also won gold medals in team competition and in both apparatus finals.

Senior 
In 2020, Anna was added to Russian National Reserve Team as a senior group gymnast. Reserve group took part in Grand Prix Tartu in February. Anna and her teammates placed second in Group All-Around competition after Uzbekistan and took gold medals in both Apparatus Finals. In October, Russian Federation organized 2nd Online Tournament in rhythmic gymnastics, where reserve group won in Group All-Around competition (69.050) in front of Uzbekistan.

References

External links 
 

Russian rhythmic gymnasts
2004 births
Living people
Gymnasts from Moscow
Medalists at the Junior World Rhythmic Gymnastics Championships
21st-century Russian women